Bummi is the title of a German magazine for children in kindergarten age. The eponymous hero Bummi is an upright walking, yellow-furred teddy bear.

Bummi was first published on 15 February 1957 as a monthly in the GDR. From 1965 onwards, it was published biweekly and cost 0.25 Mark. The magazine was officially published and supported by the central organisation of the FDJ with the aimed at age group of children from 3 to 6 years. It was sold at kiosks and ordinary magazine stands. The eponymous title character was designed by Ingeborg Meyer-Rey. long-serving main contributing editor Ursula Werner-Böhnke wrote the lyrics to the Bummi-Lied, to which the melody was composed by Hans Naumilkat. The lied became part of the educational system from 1969 onwards.

At the beginning of the 1970s, the magazine introduced the "Goldene Kindersonne" (German for: "Golden Children's Sun"), which was an award, which the children could cut out of the magazine and give to a person of their choice. (in reference to other awards in the grown-up world) Children contacting the magazine to confer a "Goldene Kindersonne" award could obtain a standardised, but hand-signed thank-you letter from one of the famous contributing artists and authors.

References

External links 
 Bummi on the platform DDR-Comics.de
 Germany's longestserving children's magazine „Bummi“ turns 50 years old
 Bummi in the  DDR-Museum
Article about the Bummi-Exhibition in Rochow-Museum Reckahn 2017

External links

Children's magazines published in Germany
1957 establishments in East Germany
Magazines established in 1957
Monthly magazines published in Germany
Weekly magazines published in Germany
German-language magazines
Mass media in East Germany